"I Love Beijing Tiananmen" (formerly written "I love Peking Tiananmen"), is a children's song written during the Cultural Revolution of China.

History

The lyricist of the song was Jin Guolin, a 12-year-old student who was in 5th grade in 1970, and the composer was Jin Yueling, a 19-year-old apprentice from Shanghai Sixth Glass Factory.

This song was part of the daily routine for many primary schools. It would be sung, following "The Internationale" and "The East is Red".

The first three measures of the chorus of this song were used repeatedly as background music in Hong Kong 97, an infamous bootleg Super Famicom game released in 1995. The game, whose plot involved the transfer of sovereignty over Hong Kong in 1997, had a strong anti-Communist sentiment, and therefore, the song was used sarcastically.

Lyrics

Simplified Chinese

Traditional Chinese

Pinyin
,
;
 Máo zhǔxí,
.

Translation 
I love Beijing Tiananmen,
The sun rises above Tiananmen.
The great leader Chairman Mao,
Leads all of us forward.

External links
Audio file in original Chinese
Listen on YouTube

Cultural Revolution
Chinese patriotic songs
Maoist China propaganda songs
Songs about China